The following is a list of French people known as explorers.

Before 1500 

Jean de Béthencourt (Canary Islands)
Gadifer de la Salle (Canary Islands)

16th century 

Thomas Aubert (Newfoundland)
Jacques Cartier (North America)
Philippe de Corguilleray (Brazil)
Joseph de La Roche Daillon (North America)
François Le Grout du Closneuf (Indian Ocean)
Jean Ribault (North America)

17th century 

Michel Aco (Mississippi River)
Philippe Avril (Near East, Russia)
Jean Barbot (West Africa)
Nicolas Barré (Brazil)
Augustin de Beaulieu (Sumatra)
Étienne Brûlé (North America)
François Caron (Indonesia, Japan)
François Cauche (Indian Ocean, Madagascar)
René-Robert Cavelier, Sieur de La Salle (North America)
Samuel de Champlain (North America)
Jean Chardin (Iran, India)
Daniel de la Rivardière (South America)
Simon François Daumont de Saint-Lusson (North America)
Nicolas Denys (North America)
Sieur Dubois (Indian Ocean, Madagascar, Réunion)
Médard Chouart des Groseilliers (North America)
Henri Joutel (North America)
François de La Boullaye-Le Gouz (Iran)
Jacques Marquette (North America)
Jean Nicolet (North America)

18th century 

Jeanne Baré (circumnavigation)
Nicolas Baudin (Indian Ocean, Australia)
Jean-Baptiste Bénard de la Harpe (North America)
Louis Blanchette (North America)
Joseph Hugues Boissieu La Martinière (Pacific Ocean)
Louis Antoine de Bougainville (circumnavigation)
Étienne de Veniard, Sieur de Bourgmont (North America)
Antoine Bruni d'Entrecasteaux (Indian Ocean, Pacific Ocean)
Pierre Carré de Luzançay (Indian Ocean, Pacific Ocean)
Pierre Céloron de Blainville (North America)
Charles Pierre Claret de Fleurieu (oceans, New Guinea)
Philibert Commerson (circumnavigation, Indian Ocean)
Victor de Compiègne (Central Africa)
Julien Crozet (Indian Ocean, Antarctic)
Joachim Darquistade (South America)
Michel Dubocage (Pacific Ocean)
Abraham Duquesne-Guitton (Australia)
Louis Feuillée (Antilles, South America)
Paul Antoine Fleuriot de Langle (Pacific Ocean)
Alexandre d'Hesmivy d'Auribeau (Pacific Ocean)
Louis de l'Isle (Siberia, North America)
Jean Gilbert Nicomède Jaime (West Africa)
Charles Marie de La Condamine (South America)
Charles Joseph Lambert (Egypt, Sudan)
Jean-François de La Pérouse (Pacific Ocean)
Francis de Laporte de Castelnau (South America)
Antoine-Simon Le Page du Pratz (North America)
Lazare Picault (Indian Ocean)
Jean-François-Marie de Surville (Pacific Ocean)

19th century 

Antoine Thomson d'Abbadie (Ethiopia)
Alexandre d'Albéca (Bénin)
Jacques Arago (circumnavigation)
Léonie d'Aunet (Spitsbergen) 
Francis Barrallier (Australia)
Paul Du Chaillu (Central Africa, Scandinavia)
Ferdinand de Béhagle (Central Africa)
Joseph René Bellot (Arctic)
Paul Blanchet (Sahara)
Jules de Blosseville (Arctic)
Charles Eudes Bonin (East Asia)
Aimé Bonpland (South America)
Gabriel Bonvalot (Central Asia, Tibet)
Ismaël Bou Derba (Sahara)
Édouard Bouët-Willaumez (West Africa)
Jules Braouezec (West Africa, Central Africa)
René Caillié (West Africa)
Frédéric Cailliaud (Egypt, Sudan, Ethiopia)
Ernest Carette (Algeria)
Edmond Caron (West Africa)
Jean Chaffanjon (South America, Central Asia)
Camille de Roquefeuil (circumnavigation, Pacific Ocean)
Désiré Charnay (Mexico)
Alfred Le Chatelier (Africa)
Henri Coudreau (South America)
Paul Crampel (Central Africa)
Jules Crevaux (South America)
Armand David (East Asia) 
Louis Delaporte (Southeast Asia)
Georges Destenave (West Africa, Central Africa)
Ernest Doudart de Lagrée (Southeast Asia)
Francis Garnier (Southeast Asia)
Pierre-Médard Diard (Southeast Asia)
Albert Dolisie (Central Africa)
Ernest Doudart de Lagrée (Southeast Asia)
Camille Douls (North Africa)
Jean Duchesne-Fournet (Ethiopia)
Jules Dumont d'Urville (Pacific Ocean, Antarctic)
Louis Isidore Duperrey (Pacific Ocean)
Abel Aubert du Petit-Thouars (Pacific Ocean)
Paul Flatters (Sahara)
Charles de Foucauld (North Africa)
Fernand Foureau (Africa)
Alfred Fourneau (Central Africa)
Louis de Freycinet (Pacific Ocean)
Joseph Paul Gaimard (Arctic)
Émile Gentil (Central Africa)
Henri Grout de Beaufort (West Africa)
Charles Guillain (East Africa, Indian Ocean)
Jules Harmand (Southeast Asia)
Xavier Hommaire de Hell (Russia, Iran)
Évariste Huc (China, Mongolia)
François-Joseph-Amédée Lamy (Africa)
Jean-Baptiste Marchand (Africa)
Parfait-Louis Monteil (Africa)
Joseph Nicollet (North America)
Auguste Pavie (Southeast Asia)

20th century 

Jean Alt (Antarctica)
Louis Audouin-Dubreuil (Sahara)
Louis Brusset (Sahara)
Jean-Baptiste Charcot (Arctic, Antarctic)
Norbert Casteret (Caves)
Pierre Chevalier (caver) (Caves)
Raymond Coche (Sahara)
Alexandra David-Néel (East Asia)
Jean-Louis Étienne (Arctic, Antarctic)
Bertrand Flornoy (South America)
Édouard-Alfred Martel (Caves)
Théodore Monod (Sahara)
Paul Pelliot (Central Asia)

Haroun Tazieff (Volcanos and caves)
Paul-Émile Victor (Arctic, Antarctic)

See also 
List of explorers

French
Explorers